Duhaney may refer to:

People
Dahlia Duhaney, Jamaican sprinter
Demeaco Duhaney, English footballer
Mike Duhaney, American soccer player

Other
Duhaney Park F.C., Jamaican football team

See also
 Dulaney (disambiguation)